The 1978–79 Washington Bullets won their second consecutive Eastern Conference Championship, making it to the NBA Finals before losing to the Seattle SuperSonics. They finished the regular season with the best record in the NBA, at 54-28.

Coming off of their NBA Championship the previous season, the Bullets were transferred to the Atlantic Division. The Bullets would continue to remain one of the top teams in the league, as they captured the Atlantic Division championship with a league best record of 54–28. The Bullets ended the regular season losing 8 of their last 11 games, but rebounded in the playoffs with victories in both the Eastern Conference Semifinals and Eastern Conference Finals over the Atlanta Hawks and the San Antonio Spurs, respectively. The Bullets would proceed to have a 38-year drought without a division title until 2017; by then they had been renamed the Washington Wizards. This is the most recent appearance in the Conference Finals or NBA Finals for the franchise.

Offseason

NBA Draft
 Round 1: Roger Phegley, Dave Corzine
 Round 2: Terry Sykes (Never played in the NBA)
 Round 4: Lawrence Boston

Roster

Regular season

Season standings

Record vs. opponents

Playoffs

|- align="center" bgcolor="#ccffcc"
| 1
| April 15
| Atlanta
| W 103–89
| Elvin Hayes (31)
| Elvin Hayes (15)
| Larry Wright (6)
| Capital Centre15,721
| 1–0
|- align="center" bgcolor="#ffcccc"
| 2
| April 17
| Atlanta
| L 99–107
| Bob Dandridge (36)
| Wes Unseld (10)
| Tom Henderson (8)
| Capital Centre19,035
| 1–1
|- align="center" bgcolor="#ccffcc"
| 3
| April 20
| @ Atlanta
| W 89–77
| Elvin Hayes (19)
| Wes Unseld (16)
| Wes Unseld (8)
| Omni Coliseum15,798
| 2–1
|- align="center" bgcolor="#ccffcc"
| 4
| April 22
| @ Atlanta
| W 120–115 (OT)
| Elvin Hayes (29)
| Elvin Hayes (17)
| Bob Dandridge (5)
| Omni Coliseum15,798
| 3–1
|- align="center" bgcolor="#ffcccc"
| 5
| April 24
| Atlanta
| L 103–107
| Elvin Hayes (26)
| Elvin Hayes (14)
| Tom Henderson (11)
| Capital Centre19,035
| 3–2
|- align="center" bgcolor="#ffcccc"
| 6
| April 26
| @ Atlanta
| L 86–104
| Elvin Hayes (24)
| Wes Unseld (12)
| Wes Unseld (6)
| Omni Coliseum15,978
| 3–3
|- align="center" bgcolor="#ccffcc"
| 7
| April 29
| Atlanta
| W 100–94
| Elvin Hayes (39)
| Elvin Hayes (15)
| Bob Dandridge (8)
| Capital Centre19,035
| 4–3
|-

|- align="center" bgcolor="#ffcccc"
| 1
| May 4
| San Antonio
| L 97–118
| Bob Dandridge (25)
| Elvin Hayes (20)
| Tom Henderson (5)
| Capital Centre19,035
| 0–1
|- align="center" bgcolor="#ccffcc"
| 2
| May 6
| San Antonio
| W 115–95
| Wes Unseld (26)
| Wes Unseld (22)
| Tom Henderson (9)
| Capital Centre19,035
| 1–1
|- align="center" bgcolor="#ffcccc"
| 3
| May 9
| @ San Antonio
| L 114–116
| Bob Dandridge (28)
| Elvin Hayes (23)
| Wes Unseld (8)
| HemisFair Arena15,318
| 1–2
|- align="center" bgcolor="#ffcccc"
| 4
| May 11
| @ San Antonio
| L 102–118
| Elvin Hayes (23)
| Wes Unseld (21)
| Bob Dandridge (9)
| HemisFair Arena16,055
| 1–3
|- align="center" bgcolor="#ccffcc"
| 5
| May 13
| San Antonio
| W 107–103
| Elvin Hayes (24)
| Elvin Hayes (22)
| Tom Henderson (9)
| Capital Centre19,035
| 2–3
|- align="center" bgcolor="#ccffcc"
| 6
| May 16
| @ San Antonio
| W 108–100
| Elvin Hayes (25)
| Elvin Hayes (14)
| Dandridge, Henderson (8)
| HemisFair Arena16,055
| 3–3
|- align="center" bgcolor="#ccffcc"
| 7
| May 18
| San Antonio
| W 107–105
| Bob Dandridge (37)
| Elvin Hayes (15)
| Larry Wright (7)
| Capital Centre19,035
| 4–3
|-

|- align="center" bgcolor="#ccffcc"
| 1
| May 20
| Seattle
| W 99–97
| Larry Wright (26)
| Wes Unseld (12)
| Tom Henderson (6)
| Capital Centre19,035
| 1–0
|- align="center" bgcolor="#ffcccc"
| 2
| May 24
| Seattle
| L 82–92
| Bob Dandridge (21)
| Elvin Hayes (14)
| Bob Dandridge (5)
| Capital Centre19,035
| 1–1
|- align="center" bgcolor="#ffcccc"
| 3
| May 27
| @ Seattle
| L 95–105
| Bob Dandridge (28)
| Unseld, Hayes (14)
| Bob Dandridge (5)
| Kingdome35,928
| 1–2
|- align="center" bgcolor="#ffcccc"
| 4
| May 29
| @ Seattle
| L 112–114 (OT)
| three players tied (18)
| Wes Unseld (16)
| Tom Henderson (8)
| Seattle Center Coliseum14,098
| 1–3
|- align="center" bgcolor="#ffcccc"
| 5
| June 1
| Seattle
| L 93–97
| Elvin Hayes (29)
| Elvin Hayes (14)
| Bob Dandridge (7)
| Capital Centre19,035
| 1–4
|-

Awards and honors
 Bob Ferry, NBA Executive of the Year Award
 Elvin Hayes, All-NBA First Team
 Bob Dandridge, All-NBA Second Team
 Bob Dandridge, NBA All-Defensive First Team

References

 Bullets on Basketball Reference

Washington
Washington Wizards seasons
Eastern Conference (NBA) championship seasons
Wash
Wash